A killing field, in military science, is an area in front of a defensive position that the enemy must cross during an assault and is specifically intended to allow the defending troops to incapacitate a large number of the enemy. Defensive emplacements such as anti-tank obstacles, barbed wire and minefields are often used to funnel the enemy into these killing fields. The fields are generally cleared of most cover so that attackers are exposed when being fired upon. Some methods of destroying the assault capabilities of attacking forces include machine guns, artillery and mortars; often with interlocking fields of fire. Such a term may be used to describe the approaches to an "ideal" defensive fortification. An example of a killing field would be the exposed beaches in front of the seawall at Normandy.

The term originated in medieval warfare to describe clear areas outside of a castle's walls such as pastures or specifically cleared fields where enemy soldiers could be easily and methodically killed in large numbers by ranged weapons. It also refers to areas within castles specially designed to bunch attackers who had breached the outer defenses into an area where the defenders could kill them easily through arrow loops and murder holes. Often these were small courtyards surrounded by high walls.

See also
Kill zone

References

Land warfare